Whole Travel is a travel search engine website based in United States. Launched in 2008, it aggregates information from thousands of other travel sites and evaluates each destination's sustainability in order to help users find and book sustainable vacations. Whole Travel combines search results from hotel websites, online travel agencies, local consolidators and other sources such as larger hotel chains.

Whole Travel does not sell directly to the consumer; rather, it aggregates results from other sites then redirects the visitor to one of these sites to complete their bookings. Thus, Whole Travel makes money from pay per click advertising, when the consumer clicks-through to one  of the supplier websites. In addition, Whole Travel offers hotels and resorts the option to use a subscription model that provides entry into the online travel market.

The company was established in September 2006 by a group of recent college graduates from Stanford University. It is headquartered in Palo Alto, California and works with partners in every region of the world. It received a warm welcome at launch, with articles in media sources including the Los Angeles Times and TechCrunch.

Whole Ranking
Whole Ranking is a metric for comparing the sustainability of multiple hotels. The system was developed by Whole Travel in conjunction with non-profit organizations such as Rainforest Alliance and academics at Stanford University. Each hotel receives a Level 1-5 ranking based on their sustainability practices in four key areas:

 Environmental Management.
 Economic Management. 
 Customer Interaction. 
 Social and Cultural Support.

Whole Travel Foundation
During the summer of 2008, Whole Travel Foundation was formed in order to actively improve sustainability in travel and tourism worldwide. Instead of being constrained by Whole Travel's growth, the foundation was set up as a 501(c)(3) organization and actively seeks funds in order to complete sustainability projects around the world.

References

External links
 WholeTravel.com official website
 World Travel
 Two new websites join the greenscape - USA Today
 Whole Travel launches good site at bad time - CNET

Travel ticket search engines
Internet properties established in 2008